Hoodsport is a census-designated place (CDP) in Mason County, Washington, United States. The population was 376 at the 2010 census. Hoodsport is located along the Hood Canal, at the intersection of U.S. Route 101 and State Route 119. Lake Cushman is  up the road on State Route 119. Hoodsport is the gateway to the Staircase area of the Olympic National Park.

History 
The first white person to settle at Hoodsport was G.K. Robbins, a ship captain who had been transporting lumber along Hood Canal for years. Other settlers soon joined him, forming a small community. Most occupied themselves with farming or logging. The town was officially platted in 1890 by the Mason County Mine and Development Company, which owned manganese mines near Lake Cushman. Prospectors found evidence of copper in the area and over 400 mining claims were filed during the late 19th and early 20th centuries. Nearly all claims failed to yield.

Geography 
Hoodsport is renowned among SCUBA divers as a staging area to view the giant Pacific octopus. Local marine preserves such as Octopus Hole and Sund Rock offer divers the chance to see octopus, as well as wolf eels, rock fish, plumose anemones and other marine life.

Climate
This region experiences warm (but not hot) and dry summers, with no average monthly temperatures above .  According to the Köppen Climate Classification system, Hoodsport has a warm-summer Mediterranean climate, abbreviated "Csb" on climate maps.

Economy 
     
The Hoodsport Winery is located about one mile south of town. Other Hoodsport businesses include a grocery store with gas station and a hardware store, plus three restaurants, an espresso shop, two real estate offices, a dentist, a post office, a beauty salon, a brewery, a distillery, a diving shop and several tourism-oriented gift shops. The Washington State Department of Fish and Wildlife operates a fish hatchery in town.

The Hoodsport branch of the Timberland Regional Library overlooks the town.

Parks and recreation

A public beach and dock located in the community are overseen by the Port of Hoodsport.

References

External links 
Hoodsport page at the Mason County Tourism website

Census-designated places in Washington (state)
Census-designated places in Mason County, Washington